Nikolayevka-2 is a rural locality (a selo) in Nikolayevsky Selsoviet of Zeysky District, Amur Oblast, Russia. The population was 20 as of 2018. There are 7 streets.

Geography 
Nikolayevka-2 is located 33 km southwest of Zeya (the district's administrative centre) by road. Nikolayevka is the nearest rural locality.

References 

Rural localities in Zeysky District